Stuart Brooks may refer to:

 Stuart Brooks (The Young and the Restless), character from The Young and the Restless
 Stuart M. Brooks (born 1936), American pulmonary doctor